Aspisoma physonotum is a species of firefly from the genus Aspisoma. The species were originally described by Henry Stephen Gorham in 1884. 

A. physontum are found predominatly in Brazil, as well as Colombia and Ecuador. They are pale green in colour.

References 

Lampyridae
Bioluminescent insects
Beetles described in 1884
Insects of Brazil
Arthropods of Colombia